The 1963 St. Louis Cardinals season was the team's 82nd season in St. Louis, Missouri and its 72nd season in the National League. The Cardinals went 93–69 (.574) during the season, and finished 2nd in the National League, six games behind the eventual World Series champion Los Angeles Dodgers. The season was Stan Musial's 22nd and final season with the team, and in MLB.

Offseason 
 October 5, 1962: Red Schoendienst was released by the Cardinals.
 October 17, 1962: Larry Jackson, Lindy McDaniel, and Jimmie Schaffer were traded by the Cardinals to the Chicago Cubs for Don Cardwell, George Altman and Moe Thacker.
 November 19, 1962: Don Cardwell and Julio Gotay were traded by the Cardinals to the Pittsburgh Pirates for Dick Groat and Diomedes Olivo.
 November 26, 1962: Tom Matchick was drafted from the Cardinals by the Detroit Tigers in the 1962 first-year draft.
 Prior to 1963 season: Duke Carmel was acquired from the Indians by the St. Louis Cardinals.
 February 1963: Coco Laboy was signed as a free agent by the Cardinals.

Regular season 
Future Hall of Famer Stan Musial played his final game on September 29, a 3–2 victory in 14 innings against the visiting Cincinnati Reds.

All four starting infielders in the 1963 All-Star Game were Cardinals. Ken Boyer (3B), Dick Groat (SS), and Bill White (1B) were elected, and Julián Javier (2B) took over for the elected but injured Bill Mazeroski of Pittsburgh.

Pitcher Bobby Shantz, first baseman Bill White, third baseman Ken Boyer, and outfielder Curt Flood won Gold Gloves this year.

Season standings

Record vs. opponents

Notable transactions 
 April 2, 1963: Minnie Miñoso was purchased from the Cardinals by the Washington Senators.
 April 1963: Bob Smith was purchased from the Cardinals by the Boston Red Sox.
 June 13, 1963: Elrod Hendricks was released by the Cardinals.
 July 29, 1963: Duke Carmel was traded by the Cardinals to the New York Mets for Jacke Davis and cash.

Roster

Player stats

Batting

Starters by position 
Note: Pos = Position; G = Games played; AB = At bats; H = Hits; Avg. = Batting average; HR = Home runs; RBI = Runs batted in

Other batters 
Note: G = Games played; AB = At bats; H = Hits; Avg. = Batting average; HR = Home runs; RBI = Runs batted in

Pitching

Starting pitchers 
Note: G = Games pitched; IP = Innings pitched; W = Wins; L = Losses; ERA = Earned run average; SO = Strikeouts

Other pitchers 
Note: G = Games pitched; IP = Innings pitched; W = Wins; L = Losses; ERA = Earned run average; SO = Strikeouts

Relief pitchers 
Note: G = Games pitched; W = Wins; L = Losses; SV = Saves; ERA = Earned run average; SO = Strikeouts

Awards and honors 
 Johnny Keane, Associated Press NL Manager of the Year
All-Star Game
Bill White, first base, starter
Ken Boyer, third base, starter
Dick Groat, shortstop, starter
Stan Musial, reserve

Farm system 

LEAGUE CHAMPIONS: Tulsa

References

External links
1963 St. Louis Cardinals at Baseball Reference
1963 St. Louis Cardinals team page at www.baseball-almanac.com

St. Louis Cardinals seasons
Saint Louis Cardinals season
St Louis